Harvey Jones (born 16 August 1936) was a footballer who played as a wing half in the Football League for Wrexham and Chester. In 1958, he played in the National Soccer League with Toronto Sparta for two seasons.

References

1936 births
Living people
Sportspeople from Conwy County Borough
Association football wing halves
Welsh footballers
Liverpool F.C. players
Wrexham A.F.C. players
Chester City F.C. players
Ellesmere Port Town F.C. players
English Football League players
Canadian National Soccer League players